Moscow Society of Stamp Collectors was one of the first philatelic organisations in the Russian Empire that was created in Moscow in 1883. Later on, it was dissolved and restored in 1907.

History 
In the 1860s and 1870s organisations of philatelists were founded in the United States, Great Britain, Germany, and France. Such organisations appeared later in other countries including Russia. In 1883, such a society was established in Moscow, among the first philatelic organisations in the Russian Empire. It was called the Moscow Society of Postage Stamp Collectors. By its 10th anniversary the Society had 26 members and published a brochure about its history.

The Society ceased in 1898, and after confirmation of the charter in 1907, it was re-established under the name of Moscow Society of Stamp Collectors.

After the October Revolution, most former members of the pre-revolutionary Society joined the new Moscow Society of Philatelists and Collectors organised in 1918.

See also 
 Moscow Municipal Society of Collectors
 Moscow Society of Philatelists and Collectors
 Postage stamps and postal history of Russia

References

Further reading 
  Archived from the original and another source on 2015-05-15.

External links 
 

Philately of Russia
1883 establishments in the Russian Empire
1910s disestablishments in the Russian Empire
Philatelic organizations
Organizations based in Moscow
Non-profit organizations based in Russia
Culture in Moscow
Defunct organizations based in Russia